Michael Carter (born 29 June 1947) is a Scottish actor of film, stage and television, known for portraying Gerald Bringsley in An American Werewolf in London, Bib Fortuna in Star Wars: Return of the Jedi, and Von Thurnburg in The Illusionist.

Early life
Michael Carter was born 29 June 1947, and brought up in Dumfries, Scotland, and educated at Dumfries Academy, where he was goalkeeper in the school football team. He trained at the Royal Academy of Dramatic Arts (RADA) in London, graduating in 1969.

Career

Early work
Carter's earliest role was in the Doctor Who serial The Mind of Evil (1971), in which he played a UNIT soldier and a prisoner. He made his film debut in An American Werewolf in London (1981) as London Underground passenger Gerald Bringsley who is killed by the werewolf.

Star Wars
In 1983, Carter portrayed Bib Fortuna in Return of the Jedi (1983) he had come to the attention of casting director Mary Selway, who saw him perform in a musical in the West End theatre section of London in the early 1980s. Director Richard Marquand had also seen and enjoyed Carter's theater work, and wanted to cast him as Fortuna; Marquand, who described Carter as a "terrific actor", was drawn to him for the role because he wanted Fortuna to be very tall, and Carter was about six feet tall. Marquand invited Carter to meet at a studio in Elstree Studios to discuss a role he was casting in a film, which Marquand would only identify by its fake working title Blue Harvest. Carter was performing on a television series at the time. Carter's train was late and Marquand was in a meeting when he arrived, and the front desk forgot to inform Marquand that he arrived, so Carter waited for an hour without being called in. Marquand happened upon Carter as he was leaving for the day, and the meeting took place. During the 30-minute meeting, Marquand informed him the part was an alien in a science-fiction film, also describing it as a children's film, and that Carter could have the role without auditioning if he wanted it, but Marquand could not discuss any details about the character or film because it was a "top secret Hollywood movie". Carter was initially not sure the part interested him, but Marquand persisted, and Carter reluctantly agreed. Only then did Marquand reveal that it was a Star Wars film. Carter was sworn to secrecy about the role, but he told his family about the part anyway, and the next day his daughter discussed it publicly with a friend at her school.

Carter had never seen the original Star Wars film, and had only seen the sequel, The Empire Strikes Back, because he was working at the time in a theater production with Anthony Daniels, who played C-3PO in the film. Carter spent three months undergoing extensive makeup casts and tests for the character at Elstree Studios before shooting began. Molds were made from his hands and head. Several foam appliances were sculpted to conform to Carter's face, and molds were made and cast into foam latex, which were then trimmed and carefully glued to the actor's face. It took about eight-and-a-half hours to apply the makeup to Carter the first time, though the process was eventually reduced to slightly under an hour. Carter had been told a great deal of makeup would be involved with the part, but he said, "I did not know what I was letting myself in for when it came to having to wear so much makeup. It did come as a bit of a shock."

Following his appearance in Return of the Jedi, Carter was offered several alien roles or parts that involved heavy amounts of prosthetics. For example, he was cast in the role of Radu Molasar, a monster and warlord in the Michael Mann film The Keep (1983), as a direct result of his work in Return of the Jedi. Carter has continued to receive letters and autograph requests from Star Wars fans for decades after the film's release, and he has made appearances at sci-fi and fantasy conventions. Carter was offered the opportunity to reprise the role of Bib Fortuna in the prequel The Phantom Menace, but he declined due to the rigors associated with the makeup application.

Other roles
He co-wrote the 1991 film One Man's War starring Anthony Hopkins.

On stage Carter has appeared at the National Theatre, in the West End, and in Broadway theatre.

His appearances on television include Rebus with both John Hannah and Ken Stott, and Taggart. He starred as the polygynist husband of Brenda Fricker and Josette Simon in the 1992 TV mini-series Seekers, and as Tulloch, head of the Helicopter Emergency Medical Service in Thames TV's seven part series Call Red. Carter created the role of Douglas Raeburn in twenty two episodes of BBC Scotland's Two Thousand Acres of Sky.

He has performed voice work in the video games Demon's Souls, and Dark Souls.

Filmography

Film

Television

Video games

References

Inline citations

Sources

External links
 
 Michael Carter BFI

1947 births
20th-century Scottish male actors
21st-century Scottish male actors
Alumni of RADA
Living people
People from Dumfries
Scottish male film actors
Scottish male television actors
Scottish male stage actors
Scottish male video game actors
Scottish male voice actors
Scottish screenwriters